Bilavar Rural District is a rural district (dehestan) in the Central District of Kamyaran County, Kurdistan Province, Iran. At the 2006 census, its population was 5,484, in 1,260 families. The rural district has 28 villages.

References 

Rural Districts of Kurdistan Province
Kamyaran County